Bobby Wardel Sandimanie III (born July 30, 2001), known professionally as Destroy Lonely, is an American rapper. He is best known for his mixtape No Stylist (2022) which peaked at number 91 on the Billboard 200. He is also the son of rapper I-20 who was signed to Ludacris' label Disturbing tha Peace. 

Destroy Lonely signed to Playboi Carti's Opium label through Interscope Records and Ingrooves in early 2021 and is often affiliated with his labelmate Ken Carson. The Rolling Stone magazine cites him as being characterized by his "dynamic yet blaring" instrumentals and his unique aesthetic consisting of dark attire and designer clothes.

Early and personal life 
Bobby Wardel Sandimanie III was born in Atlanta, Georgia on July 30, 2001. He has two younger sisters and an older brother which he mentions as only being half-siblings. He mentions feeling more like an only child. He grew up freestyling with inspiration from his father American rapper I-20. He began home school in the sixth grade with given permission from his grandmother who was a former teacher. He enrolled back in school in the ninth and tenth grades where he recalls abusing the drug Xanax. He cites his feeling that his substance abuse was destroying him as the origin of the "Destroy" part of his stage name. He spent his adolescent years in solitude which he cites as the origin of the "Lonely" part of his stage name. During his time in school, he had strength in writing.

Career

2015–2019: Beginnings 
Destroy Lonely started working on music at the age of 14, making his first songs in a recording studio at his school. He met two of his best friends, Texaco and Nezzus, who would produce many of his early works and continue to work with him on later projects at school. Immediately upon meeting Nezzus, they began recording their first project, NezzusDestroyed. Lonely would later go on to gain traction with his 2019 track "Bane".

2020–present: </3, </3², No Stylist and If Looks Could Kill  

On September 25, 2020, Destroy Lonely would release his third mixtape titled </3 (alternatively Broken Hearts) and a month after on October 31, 2020, would release the deluxe edition titled </3². Following the release of </3 in 2020 and the attention from "Bane", Destroy Lonely was noticed by Playboi Carti in December 2020 after the music video for his song "Oh Yeah" released. In early 2021, he signed to Carti's record label, Opium. 

In April 2021, he appeared in Playboi Carti's music video for his song "Sky". In April 2022, he was announced as a performer at the Lyrical Lemonade Summer Smash. In July 2022, Destroy Lonely appeared on frequent collaborator Ken Carson's studio album X.
Also in July 2022, he appeared on fellow Atlanta rapper Bktherula's single "Forever Pt. 2" and Rochester rapper Slump6s' album Genesis. In August 2022, Destroy Lonely released his fifth mixtape titled No Stylist. The album features a sole appearance from his labelmate Ken Carson. In September 2022, he and fellow Opium rapper Ken Carson gifted Playboi Carti a ring for his 26th birthday. In October 2022, he announced the dates for his "No Stylist" tour.
Also in October he released a music video to his track "VTMNTSCOAT" which is described as containing imagery of "elaborate dinner parties and midnight car rides".

On November 18, 2022, Destroy Lonely followed up his mixtape "No Stylist" with "NS+ (Ultra). This being his deluxe version of the mixtape, featuring five new songs, and naming it "Ultra" after his pet cat. Following this on February 20th, 2023, Destroy Lonely released a music video for songs "NEVEREVER" and "FAKENGGAS" on his YouTube.

On February 21, 2023, Lonely took to Tumblr and announced that his album If Looks Could Kill would be getting released on April 2023, stating: "my album comes out in april..".

On March 3, 2023, Destroy Lonely released the highly anticipated single "If Looks Could Kill", which is expected to be the lead single for his album of the same name.

Musical style
The Rolling Stone magazine mentions Destroy Lonely's unique way of shifting cadence and the usage of humorous lyrics in his music. He cites his influence as being rock bands such as Crystal Castles, Deftones, and The Cure and rap predecessors such as Lil Wayne, Drake, Future, Young Thug, and Playboi Carti. His music has been described by Brandon Callender of The Fader in the following manner: "Destroy Lonely has an eclectic ear for beats that skews toward twinkly, atmospheric beats that function like canvases, his voice vivid splashes of paint." This atmospheric sound is achieved through the use of ambient synthesizers and samples from orchestras and video game soundtracks like Genshin Impact.

Discography

Studio albums

Mixtapes

Extended plays

Singles

Tours

Headlining 

 No Stylist Tour (2022–2023)

Supporting 

 Ken Carson – The X Man Tour (2022)

References

External links
 

Wikipedia Student Program
Living people
African-American male rappers
Rappers from Atlanta
Southern hip hop musicians
2001 births
21st-century American rappers
21st-century American male musicians
21st-century African-American musicians